Parafield Gardens railway station is located on the Gawler line.

History 

Parafield Gardens was first opened on 1 May 1968.

It is one of only two stations on the Gawler Central line to have a pedestrian underpass (the other is Greenfields). The other stations have had theirs closed due to concerns with safety and vandalism. To the west of the station lies the Australian Rail Track Corporation standard gauge line to Crystal Brook.

Services by platform

References

External links

Railway stations in Adelaide
Railway stations in Australia opened in 1968